Sonia Chahal is an Indian amateur boxer. She is a silver medallist at the 2018 AIBA Women's World Boxing Championships.

Early life and career
Chahal was born in Nimri village of Haryana state's Bhiwani district. She is the younger of two children of Mr. Jai Bhagwan, a farmer, and homemaker mother Neelam.

She started boxing in 2011 after taking inspiration from Kavita Chahal. And after six months of training at the Bhiwani Boxing Club under the coach Jagdish Singh, she won silver medal at the school-level national championships in the same year. She continued her training in Bhiwani for the next three years.

Chahal won silver medal in the featherweight division (54–57 kg) of the 2018 AIBA Women's World Boxing Championships after losing in the final to Germany's Ornella Wahner.

References

Living people
Featherweight boxers
Indian women boxers
Boxers from Haryana
People from Bhiwani district
AIBA Women's World Boxing Championships medalists
Year of birth missing (living people)
21st-century Indian women